Victor Amadeus of Savoy, 3rd Prince of Carignano (1 March 1690 – 4 April 1741) was an Italian nobleman who was Prince of Carignano from 1709 to 1741. He was the son of Emmanuel Philibert of Savoy, Prince of Carignano and his wife, the  Maria Angela Caterina d'Este.

Biography

Born in Turin, he was the third child of four and the eldest son.

Made a Knight of the Annunciation in 1696, he married, at Moncalieri on 7 November 1714, Marie Victoire Françoise of Savoy (1690–1766), legitimised daughter of Victor Amadeus II of Piedmont-Sardinia, King of Piedmont-Sardinia and of Jeanne Baptiste d'Albert de Luynes, Countess of Verrue.

His father-in-law showed affection for him but ended up depriving him, in 1717, of his 400,000 livres of annual income because of excessive spending. It was then that he ran away to France, at the end of 1718, in order to take possession of his inheritance.
 
Since he had lost the Château de Condé to Jean-François Leriget de La Faye when it was confiscated from his family by Louis XIV on 6 March 1719, he established himself in the hôtel de Soissons, which he transformed, with his wife who had followed him there, into a "sumptuous gaming house" which for a time sheltered the economist John Law. He died, ruined, and his hôtel was razed to construct in its place a grain-trading hall, now the site of the Bourse de commerce de Paris.

Next to his mother-in-law, Jeanne Baptiste d'Albert de Luynes, Countess of Verrue, he counted in the 1730s among the most influential amateurs and art collectors in Paris. He gathered in an important painting collection which was sold after his death in 1742 partly to Louis XV, King of France, and to August III of Poland, King of Poland and Elector of Saxony.

He had a passion for the Paris Opéra, and was named intendant of the Menus-Plaisirs by Louis XV. He brought about the disgrace of the tax farmer Alexandre Le Riche de La Poupelinière after he caught him in the company of his mistress, the actress Marie Antier.

Family
Victor Amadeus' children were:

 Joseph Victor Amédée (1716 – 1716)
 Anne Thérèse of Savoy (1717–1745), married in 1741 to Charles de Rohan, prince de Soubise (1715–1787)
 Louis-Victor of Savoy (1721–1778), Prince of Carignan, married to Landgravine Christine of Hesse-Rotenburg, had issue.
 Victor Amédée (1722, died young)
 a daughter, born in  1729

Ancestry

References 

 Virginie Spenlé: Torino – Parigi – Dresda. Le collezioni Verrua e Carignano nella Pinacoteca di Dresda, in: Le raccolte del principe Eugenio condottiero e intellettuale, Milano/Torino: Silvana Editoriale / La Veneria Reale 2012, S. 144–157, 

1690 births
1741 deaths
Princes of Carignan
Nobility from Turin
Burials at the Basilica of Superga
Victor
Dukes of Carignan